Michael Worrall (born 22 March 1962) is a former professional rugby league footballer who played in the 1970s, 1980s and 1990s.

Playing career

International honours
Mick Worrall won caps for Great Britain while at Oldham in 1984 against France, and Australia (two matches).

County Cup Final appearances
Mick Worrall played right-, i.e. number 12, in Oldham's 6–27 defeat by Wigan in the 1986 Lancashire County Cup Final during the 1986–87 season at Knowsley Road, St. Helens on Sunday 19 October 1986, and played right-, i.e. number 12, and scored a drop goal in Salford's 17–22 defeat by Wigan in the 1988 Lancashire County Cup Final during the 1988–89 season at Knowsley Road, St. Helens on Sunday 23 October 1988.

References

External links
Statistics at orl-heritagetrust.org.uk
Photograph "Mick Worrall Salford RL 1991 – Salford £55,000 Record Signing 1987" at flickr.com
Mick Worrall try at youtube.com

1962 births
Living people
English rugby league players
Rugby league locks
Rugby league second-rows
Oldham R.L.F.C. players
Salford Red Devils players
Leeds Rhinos players
Rochdale Hornets players
Great Britain national rugby league team players
Place of birth missing (living people)